Jerome Edward Listecki (born March 12, 1949) is an American prelate of the Roman Catholic Church who has served as Archbishop of the Archdiocese of Milwaukee, Wisconsin, since 2010.

Previously Listecki served as an auxiliary bishop of the Archdiocese of Chicago (2001–2004) and as the Bishop of the Diocese of La Crosse (2004–2009).

Biography

Early years
Jerome Listecki was born in Chicago, Illinois, and raised on the Southeast Side. His father (d. 1986) owned a tavern before working as a bus driver for the Chicago Transit Authority. Jerome received his early education at the parochial school of St. Michael the Archangel Church before attending Quigley Preparatory Seminary South, from where he graduated in 1967. He earned a Bachelor of Arts degree from Saint Joseph College Seminary in 1971, and completed his theological studies at St. Mary of the Lake Seminary (in Mundelein, Illinois). During his summers as a seminarian, he worked in a blast furnace sintering plant in the US Steel mills near Chicago.

Ordination and ministry
Listecki was ordained to the priesthood by Cardinal John Cody on May 14, 1975.

After studies in canon law and moral theology in Rome, Listecki earned a licentiate and doctorate in canon law from the Pontifical University of St. Thomas Aquinas (Angelicum) in 1981 with a dissertation entitled Indissolubility and the United Methodist Church. He previously earned a Juris Doctor degree from DePaul University. During his service to the Archdiocese of Chicago, he taught at both Quigley Preparatory Seminary North (later Archbishop Quigley Preparatory Seminary) and St. Mary of the Lake Seminary, served in a number of Chicago parishes and as pastor of St. Ignatius Church, worked within the Archdiocesan Chancery as an Appellate Judge for the Matrimonial Tribunal and separately as in-house legal counsel for the Archdiocese of Chicago from 1985 to 1987, and served as the chaplain to the Catholic Physicians' Guild of Chicago.

His media experience included co-hosting the Chicago radio station WIND program "Catholic Conversation" from 1978 to 1979, his regular participation as celebrant for the WGN TV "Mass for Shut-ins", as well as service as a producer for several other television programs.

Auxiliary Bishop of Chicago

On November 7, 2000, Listecki was appointed titular bishop of Nara and auxiliary bishop for the Archdiocese of Chicago by Pope John Paul II. He was consecrated on January 8, 2001.

Bishop of La Crosse, Wisconsin
On December 29, 2004, Listecki was appointed Bishop of the Diocese of La Crosse, succeeding Bishop Raymond Leo Burke who became archbishop of the Archdiocese of St. Louis, Missouri in St. Louis, Missouri. On March 1, 2005, he was installed as Bishop of the Diocese of La Crosse.

At La Crosse he initiated a $50 million fundraising campaign, a planning process to restructure ministry and parishes in the diocese, and was instrumental in the development of the Shrine of Our Lady of Guadalupe, a project initiated by his predecessor, Bishop Burke.

Archbishop of Milwaukee, Wisconsin
Bishop Listecki was named Archbishop of Milwaukee by Pope Benedict XVI on November 14, 2009. He was installed on January 4, 2010, by the Apostolic Nuncio to the United States of America, Archbishop Pietro Sambi. As Archbishop of Milwaukee, the metropolitan see of the Ecclesiastical Province of Milwaukee (the entire state of Wisconsin), he received the pallium on June 29, 2010, from Pope Benedict XVI.

Listecki served as an Army Reserve chaplain in the United States Army Reserve for 20 years, retiring as a lieutenant colonel.

Criticism
The Survivors Network of those Abused by Priests (SNAP) criticized Archbishop Listecki on January 6, 2010, for allowing retired archbishops Rembert Weakland of Milwaukee and Daniel Edward Pilarczyk of Cincinnati, who were implicated in covering up of cases of sexual abuse, to say Mass at St. John's Cathedral in Milwaukee. On January 12, 2010, during a hearing of the Wisconsin State Senate on a bill to extend the statute of limitations for reporting abuse as supported by Milwaukee District Attorney John T. Chisholm. State Senator Glenn Grothman joined in this criticism, and also questioned Listecki on why he allowed Weakland, who had been accused of moving around abusive priests, to keep his title as Emeritus Archbishop of Milwaukee, as well as retaining the name Weakland Center on the pastoral center at St. John's Cathedral. Listecki testified against the bill, saying it would single out Catholic institutions and bankrupt the Milwaukee Archdiocese.

Listecki was publicly criticized in February 2010 by Jerry Matysik, the Eau Claire Police Chief, and SNAP for allegedly misleading the Wisconsin State Legislature about the LaCrosse diocese abuse notification procedure in Listecki's testimony against extending the statute of limitations, stating, "Archbishop Listecki appears more interested in protecting the organization than he is in protecting children," and again in August 2010 by SNAP for passing up action on an abuse claim due to lack of evidence.

The Archbishop apologized to victims of clergy sexual abuse on March 30, 2010, in a statement that said that both the individual perpetrators, as well as the bishops who failed to stop the abuse, "go against everything the Church and the priesthood represent." He credited the bravery of "victim-survivors" who persisted in bringing their cases to light and forcing the Church to change. "We owe these victims/survivors our deep gratitude and we acknowledge our own actions have not always expressed that gratitude adequately." He defended Pope Benedict XVI's role in the matter:

Three years later, the New York Times commented, Listecki was likely referring to the "learning curve" that psychiatrists and the clergy whom they advised experienced when it became clear, in about 2002, that pedophiles were not often likely to be cured of their tendencies.

See also

 Catholic Church hierarchy
 Catholic Church in the United States
 Historical list of the Catholic bishops of the United States
 List of Catholic bishops of the United States
 Lists of patriarchs, archbishops, and bishops

References

External links
Roman Catholic Archdiocese of Milwaukee Official Site
Official site of the Holy See

1949 births
Living people
21st-century Roman Catholic archbishops in the United States
American people of Polish descent
Roman Catholic archbishops of Milwaukee
DePaul University College of Law alumni
Lawyers from Chicago
Loyola University Chicago alumni
Military personnel from Illinois
Pontifical University of Saint Thomas Aquinas alumni
Religious leaders from Wisconsin
Roman Catholic Archdiocese of Chicago
Roman Catholic bishops of La Crosse
University of Saint Mary of the Lake alumni
Religious leaders from Illinois
Catholics from Illinois